Datuk Yusof bin Yacob is a Malaysian politician who  has served as Chairman of the Qhazanah Sabah Berhad since January 2023 and the Member of Sabah State Legislative Assembly (MLA) for Sindumin since May 2018.  He served as State Minister of Education and Innovation of Sabah in the Heritage Party (WARISAN) state administration under former Chief Minister Shafie Apdal from May 2018 to the collapse of the WARISAN administration in September 2020, Deputy Speaker of the Dewan Rakyat from May 2004 to December 2007 and Member of Parliament (MP) for Sipitang from April 1995 to March 2008. He is a member of the Parti Gagasan Rakyat Sabah (GAGASAN), a component party of the Gabungan Rakyat Sabah (GRS) coalition. He was a member of the WARISAN, before leaving the party on 8 October 2021 to become an independent in support of the ruling GRS coalition. He was also member of the United Malays National Organisation (UMNO), a component party of the Barisan Nasional (BN) which he left in 2018. On 22 May 2022, he confirmed that he had applied to rejoin and was pending return to BN and UMNO after leaving them four years ago. However, his application was not accepted before he withdrew the application and joined GAGASAN instead on 21 January 2023.

Election results

Honours 
 :
  Commander of the Order of Kinabalu (PGDK) – Datuk  (1997)

References

Living people
Malaysian Muslims
Members of the Dewan Rakyat
Sabah Heritage Party politicians
United Malays National Organisation politicians
1955 births
Commanders of the Order of Kinabalu